HLA complex group 4 pseudogene 11, also known as HCG4P11, is a human gene.

Pseudogenes